Anthony Joseph Battaglia (born April 10, 1949) is a Senior United States district judge of the United States District Court for the Southern District of California and a former United States magistrate judge of the same court.

Early life and education
Battaglia was born in 1949, in San Diego, California. He graduated from United States International University in 1971 with a Bachelor of Arts. Battaglia then earned his Juris Doctor from California Western School of Law in 1974.

Federal judicial service

United States magistrate judge service
In 1993, Battaglia was selected to serve as a United States magistrate judge for the United States District Court for the Southern District of California.

District court service
On May 20, 2010, President Barack Obama nominated Battaglia for a district court judgeship on the Southern District of California. to fill the seat vacated by Judge James Lorenz. He was renominated at the beginning of the 112th Congress. On February 4, 2011, Battaglia was unanimously approved by the Senate Judiciary Committee. On March 7, 2011, the Senate confirmed his nomination by a 89–0 vote. and he received his commission on March 9, 2011. He assumed senior status on March 31, 2021.

References

External links

1949 births
California Western School of Law alumni
Judges of the United States District Court for the Southern District of California
Living people
United States district court judges appointed by Barack Obama
21st-century American judges
United States International University alumni
United States magistrate judges
American people of Italian descent